The Conspiracy is an alliance of five supervillains appearing in American comic books published by Marvel Comics.

Fictional history
The group known as "The Conspiracy" was formed with the intent of recovering fragments of the Bloodgem which Ulysses Bloodstone shattered in his initial confrontation with his nemesis, the extraterrestrial Ullux'yl Kwan T'ae 'Sny. When the Bloodgem shattered, one of the fragments became embedded in Bloodstone's chest granting him super human strength and immortality. The Conspiracy's goal was to reunite the Bloodgem fragments into a single gem with the intent of gaining power as Bloodstone had.

The Conspiracy eventually succeeded in obtaining and reuniting the Bloodgem fragments, including Ulysses Bloodstone's fragment which they surgically removed from his chest, killing him in the process. However, rather than gaining the power they desired from the gem's restoration, instead the souls of The Conspiracy members were pulled from their bodies and into the gem by the Exo-mind, a malevolent personality that dwelt inside the Bloodgem. The Exo-Mind used the life energies of The Conspiracy to transform the Bloodgem into a giant crystalline monster. Ulysses Bloodstone, resurrected briefly by the residual energy of his Bloodgem fragment, gave his life to destroy the crystalline monster and the five members of The Conspiracy presumably perished in the resulting explosion.

Years later, Captain America came across the skeletal remains of the Conspiracy member's bodies as he was exploring their abandoned subterranean base beneath New York City. Despite the existence of the remains, one member of The Conspiracy, Centurius, has been shown to be still alive.

Members
Atlan: A sentient dolphin with mystical powers.
Bubbles O'Day: A female stripper with mental powers derived from a Bloodgem fragment given to her as a gift by an admirer.
Centurius: A genius who possesses advanced knowledge of genetic engineering and technology.
Dr. Judan Bardham: An expert cardiologist who was enlisted by the group for his surgical skills which were needed to extract Ulysses Bloodstone's Bloodgem fragment.
Kaballa: A sorcerer capable of, among other things, teleportation and the conjuring of elemental demons.

References

External links